Regal Recordings is a British record label functioning as an imprint of Parlophone Records.

Background
Regal Records was a British record label founded in 1913 as a subsidiary of the UK branch of Columbia Records, known as the Columbia Graphophone Company.

The first record issues on the Regal Record label in February 1914 were re-issues of existing records from the Columbia Record Catalogue: G-6105 to G-6559, G-6440, G 6441 (English Catalogue) and G 6560 to G 6639 (Scottish Catalogue). Catalogue numbers starting from G 6000 were used at later dates.

In November 1921, 12 inch records were introduced, commencing at catalogue number G-1000.

From around 1923 onwards many earlier recordings were re-recorded acoustically and released under the same catalogue number as the originals. For catalogue numbers below  G-7963 (released July 1923) these may usually be identified by a matrix commencing with an 'A', rather than being completely numeric.

The Western Electric electrical process of recording was introduced in February 1926. Those records re-recorded using this process invariably have their catalogue number suffixed by 'R'.

From March 1930, all new releases were prefixed in the catalogue by 'MR', commencing at MR1.

In 1932, it was merged with the British Zonophone label and became Regal Zonophone, following the merger of those labels' respective parent companies, the Columbia Graphophone Company and the Gramophone Company, to form EMI.  A listing of records produced by Regal in this era is available from the CLPGS.

Regal today
In 1995, the Regal label was revived by EMI as the Parlophone imprint Regal Recordings. Regal Recordings' current roster includes Lily Allen, Loney Dear, Cathy Davey, and Jakobínarína. Regal, as well as Parlophone, became part of the Warner Music Group in 2013.

See also
 Parlophone
 Regal Zonophone Records
 Columbia Graphophone Company
 Zon-O-Phone Records

References

External links
 Regal Recordings MySpace page

British record labels
1914 establishments in England
1995 establishments in England
Record labels established in 1914
Record labels established in 1995
Re-established companies
Warner Music labels
Parlophone subsidiaries